At Least for Now is the debut studio album by English musician, singer, and poet Benjamin Clementine. It was released through Behind Records in France on 12 January 2015. The album was recorded after Clementine gained critical acclaim with his two previous EPs. Clementine returned to London in the new year to record his album, just as his career was starting to take off. He moved to Kensington High Street with a friend he had met in Tuscany then went back to Edmonton for a period of time until At Least for Now was completed. The album won the 2015 Mercury Music Prize.

At Least for Now went top 10 in France, and has been certified Gold there. The album was also well received by music critics, who praised its mixture of genres and uniqueness.

Album cover
Reviewer Calum Bradbury-Sparvell described the cover, noting, "Clementine stands in a shadowy profile with a Granny Smith cupped in his right hand, as if the Magritte's Son Of Man had finally plucked the offending fruit from his face, but promptly swiveled away from the limelight. An appropriate symbol for this debut LP, during which the mythos of the Edmonton-raised Métro busker, who went from sleeping rough to impressing Macca in a barefoot Later With Jools Holland performance, dissipates only to reveal something more inscrutable: a stranger in a trench coat."

Critical reception

Phil Mongredien from The Guardian said At Least for Now was "bold, brave, beautiful, and at times quite brilliant" and that "for the most part these piano-led songs sound unique."
Nake Chinen from The New York Times wrote that "As for Clementine's actual voice, it's a strange and frequently stunning instrument, a blade like tenor that can swoop into either a clarion cry or a guttural scowl. The inevitable comparison, notably on a song like "Adios", is to Nina Simone — to her demonstrative clarity of phrase, and the flickering incandescence of her timbre." AllMusic's Timothy Monger said that At Least for Now "makes its case as a one-man show for piano and voice. The compelling British singer/songwriter is dramatic, self-assured, and theatrical in the extreme, boasting a powerful voice that swells to fill the room, which, on this unique record, seems to expand and shrink at the drop of a hat. ... At Least for Now is a pop record of sorts, but completely on his own terms, and like Antony Hegarty (an acknowledged influence) and Rufus Wainwright, two artists who have similar aspirations of pseudo-classical grandeur, Clementine will no doubt be polarizing for many listeners. There is no question, however, of his raw talent, poeticism, and knack for beguiling melodies, and in this oversaturated market, the true mavericks will always rise above the din."

According to Dave Simpson of The Guardian, Clemetine "is reminiscent of Kevin Rowland in that he sounds as if he is singing from the gut, and because he has to. If only he had Rowlands' economy: mannered vocal flourishes complicate the melodies when what's needed is simplicity. The addition of syrupy strings and pedestrian drumming further dilutes the impact of his raw talent. However, when he performs unadorned, melodies dripping from his fingertips, and expressing himself, his voice is difficult to forget."

Accolades

Track listing

Personnel
Musicians
 Benjamin Clementine – vocals, piano, keyboard, percussion, foot stamping on "St-Clementine-on-Tea-and-Croissants"
 Alexis Brossard – drums
 Manu Sauvage – bass guitar, keyboard bass
 Jonathan Quarmby – bass guitar on "Quiver a Little"

Production
 Benjamin Clementine – producer
 Jonathan Quarmby – chief engineer
 Engineer – Richard Woodcraft
 Recorded at RAK Studios, London, England except the track "Adios", recorded in Paris at Marlon B Studios
 Cover design – Benjamin Clementine, Akatre, based on The Son of Man painting by René Magritte (front)
 Photography – Akatre (France inner portrait)

Charts

Weekly charts

Year-end charts

References

2015 albums
Benjamin Clementine albums
Mercury Prize-winning albums